The Hickory–Lenoir–Morganton Metropolitan Statistical Area, as defined by the United States Census Bureau, is an area consisting of four counties in the Catawba Valley region of western North Carolina. Local residents often refer to the area as the Unifour, although this name is largely unknown outside of the region.

The Census Bureau has also defined a larger Hickory–Lenoir Combined Statistical Area that includes the Unifour and  McDowell County.

The 2000 census gives the MSA's population as 341,851, with a July 1, 2009, estimate placing the population at 365,364.

Area

Counties
Alexander (36,930)
Burke (89,842)
Caldwell (81,990)
Catawba (161,723)

Anchor city
Hickory Catawba/Burke/Caldwell 43,490

Principal cities
Lenoir Caldwell 18,352
Morganton Burke 17,474

Suburban cities over 5,000 in population
(Including county and 2010 census bureau population)
Conover Catawba 8,239
Newton Catawba 12,968
Sawmills Caldwell 5,240

Suburban towns and cities under 5,000 in population
(Including county and 2010 census bureau population)
Blowing Rock Caldwell & Watauga 1,192
Brookford Catawba 382
Catawba Catawba 603
Cedar Rock Caldwell 300
Claremont Catawba 1,352
Connelly Springs Burke 1,669
Drexel Burke 1,858
Gamewell Caldwell 4,051
Glen Alpine Burke 1,517
Granite Falls Caldwell 4,722
Hildebran Burke 2,023
Hudson Caldwell 3,776
Long View Catawba & Burke 4,480
Maiden Catawba & Lincoln 3,327
Rhodhiss Burke & Caldwell 1,070
Rutherford College Burke 1,341
Taylorsville Alexander 2,098
Valdese Burke 4,490

Unincorporated communities
(2010 Census figures)
Bethlehem Alexander 4,214
Collettsville Caldwell
Hiddenite Alexander 536
Icard Burke 2,664
Lake Norman of Catawba Catawba 4,744
Mountain View Catawba 3,768
Petersburg Burke
Salem Burke 2,218
Stony Point Alexander 1,317
St.Stephens Catawba 9,439
Sherrills Ford Catawba 941
Terrell Catawba 860

Transportation

Mass transit
Greenway Public Transportation offers bus service to the cities of Conover, Hickory, Morganton, and Newton.

Roads
The Hickory region is served by Interstate 40 which passes through the center of Catawba and Burke counties.

Other important US highways in the region include: US 70 (east to Morehead City, west to Asheville), and US 321 (through Catawba and Caldwell Counties).

Primary state routes include NC 10, NC 16, NC 18, NC 90, NC 127, and NC 150.

Air
The region's primary general aviation airport is Hickory Regional Airport. The closest commercial airports are Charlotte-Douglas International Airport and Asheville Regional Airport.

Rail
With approximately twenty freight trains a day, Catawba County is a freight railroad transportation center. This is largely due to the areas strong manufacturing based economy, and its placement along the Norfolk Southern Railway line. The Caldwell County Railroad also serves the county and interchanges with Norfolk Southern in Hickory. Conover has been designated a stop on the future Western NC Rail service.

Higher education
Appalachian Center at Hickory
Caldwell Community College and Technical Institute
Catawba Valley Community College
Lenoir–Rhyne University
NC Center for Engineering Technologies
Western Piedmont Community College

Demographics
As of the census of 2000, there were 341,851 people, 133,966 households, and 95,583 families residing within the MSA. The racial makeup of the MSA was 87.47% White, 6.91% African American, 0.25% Native American, 2.31% Asian, 0.08% Pacific Islander, 1.95% from other races, and 1.02% from two or more races. Hispanic or Latino of any race were 4.05% of the population.

The median income for a household in the MSA was $37,647, and the median income for a family was $44,236. Males had a median income of $29,273 versus $22,266 for females. The per capita income for the MSA was $18,404.

See also
North Carolina census statistical areas
List of cities, towns, and villages in North Carolina
List of unincorporated communities in North Carolina

References

 
Geography of Alexander County, North Carolina
Geography of Burke County, North Carolina
Geography of Caldwell County, North Carolina
Geography of Catawba County, North Carolina
Metropolitan areas of North Carolina